Nasimane Ambambi (born 15 September 1990) is a Namibian cricketer. He is a right-handed batsman and right-arm medium-fast bowler. He was born in Okakundu.

Ambambi made his List A debut for the side during the 2009-10 season, against Griqualand West. From the tailend, he did not bat in the match. The young fast bowler Elton Ambambi, who broke into the national team this season, won the Rookie of the Year award.

Career statistics First-class debut Namibia v Gauteng at Windhoek, Nov 12-14, 2009 scorecard 
Last First-class Northerns v Namibia at Pretoria, Feb 4-6, 2010 scorecard 
List A debut Griqualand West v Namibia at Kimberley, Oct 18, 2009 scorecard 
Last List A Namibia v Uganda at Windhoek, Sep 25, 2010 scorecard

External links
Nasimane Ambambi at Cricket Archive
 at The Namibian
 at Cricinfo

1990 births
Living people
People from Omusati Region
Namibian cricketers